Corporate tax is imposed in the United States at the federal, most state, and some local levels on the income of entities treated for tax purposes as corporations. Since January 1, 2018, the nominal federal corporate tax rate in the United States of America is a flat 21% following the passage of the Tax Cuts and Jobs Act of 2017. State and local taxes and rules vary by jurisdiction, though many are based on federal concepts and definitions. Taxable income may differ from book income both as to timing of income and tax deductions and as to what is taxable. The corporate Alternative Minimum Tax was also eliminated by the 2017 reform, but some states have alternative taxes. Like individuals, corporations must file tax returns every year. They must make quarterly estimated tax payments. Groups of corporations controlled by the same owners  may file a consolidated return.

Some corporate transactions are not taxable. These include most formations and some types of mergers, acquisitions, and liquidations. Shareholders of a corporation are taxed on dividends distributed by the corporation. Corporations may be subject to foreign income taxes, and may be granted a foreign tax credit for such taxes. Shareholders of most corporations are not taxed directly on corporate income, but must pay tax on dividends paid by the corporation. However, shareholders of S corporations and mutual funds are taxed currently on corporate income, and do not pay tax on dividends.

In 2021 President Biden proposed that Congress raise the corporate rate from 21% to 28%.

Overview

Corporate income tax is imposed at the federal level on all entities treated as corporations (see Entity classification below), and by 47 states and the District of Columbia.  Certain localities also impose corporate income tax. Corporate income tax is imposed on all domestic corporations and on foreign corporations having income or activities within the jurisdiction. For federal purposes, an entity treated as a corporation and organized under the laws of any state is a domestic corporation.  For state purposes, entities organized in that state are treated as domestic, and entities organized outside that state are treated as foreign.

Some types of corporations (S corporations, mutual funds, etc.) are not taxed at the corporate level, and their shareholders are taxed on the corporation's income as it is recognized. Corporations which are not S Corporations are known as C corporations.

The US tax reform legislation enacted on December 22, 2017 (Public Law (P.L.) 115–97) changed the law of 'worldwide' to 'territorial' taxation in the US. The changed law includes the imposing of tax only on income derived within its borders, irrespective of the residence of the taxpayer. this system aimed at eliminating the need for complicated rules such as the controlled foreign corporation (CFC or Subpart F) rules and the passive foreign investment company (PFIC) rules that subject foreign earnings to current U.S. taxation in certain situations. Hence, P.L. (115-97) permanently reduced the 35% CIT rate on resident corporations to a flat 21% rate for tax years beginning after December 31, 2017. Corporate income tax is based on net taxable income as defined under federal or state law. Generally, taxable income for a corporation is gross income (business and possibly non-business receipts less cost of goods sold) less allowable tax deductions. Certain income, and some corporations, are subject to a tax exemption. Also, tax deductions for interest and certain other expenses paid to related parties are subject to limitations.

Corporations may choose their tax year. Generally, a tax year must be 12 months or 52/53 weeks long. The tax year need not conform to the financial reporting year, and need not coincide with the calendar year, provided books are kept for the selected tax year.  Corporations may change their tax year, which may require Internal Revenue Service consent. Most state income taxes are determined on the same tax year as the federal tax year.

Groups of companies are permitted to file single returns for the members of a controlled group or unitary group, known as consolidated returns, at the federal level, and are allowed or required to do so by certain states. The consolidated return reports the members' combined taxable incomes and computes a combined tax. Where related parties do not file a consolidated return in a jurisdiction, they are subject to transfer pricing rules.  Under these rules, tax authorities may adjust prices charged between related parties.

Shareholders of corporations are taxed separately upon the distribution of corporate earnings and profits as a dividend.  Tax rates on dividends are at present lower than on ordinary income for both corporate and individual shareholders.  To ensure that shareholders pay tax on dividends, two withholding tax provisions may apply: withholding tax on foreign shareholders, and “backup withholding” on certain domestic shareholders.

Corporations must file tax returns in all U.S. jurisdictions imposing an income tax. Such returns are a self-assessment of tax. Corporate income tax is payable in advance installments, or estimated payments, at the federal level and for many states.

Corporations may be subject to withholding tax obligations upon making certain varieties of payments to others, including wages and distributions treated as dividends. These obligations are generally not the tax of the corporation, but the system may impose penalties on the corporation or its officers or employees for failing to withhold and pay over such taxes.

In the United States, the company number used by the tax administration is known as the Employer Identification Number (EIN).

State and local income taxes

Nearly all of the states and some localities impose a tax on corporation income. The rules for determining this tax vary widely from state to state. Many of the states compute taxable income with reference to federal taxable income, with specific modifications. The states do not allow a tax deduction for income taxes, whether federal or state. Further, most states deny tax exemption for interest income that is tax exempt at the federal level. CIT rates range from 1% to 12%, varying for every state. The most common federal taxable income is based on apportionment formulae. State and municipal taxes are deductible expenses for federal income tax purposes.

Most states tax domestic and foreign corporations on taxable income derived from business activities apportioned to the state on a formulary basis. Many states apply a "throw back" concept to tax domestic corporations on income not taxed by other states.  Tax treaties do not apply to state taxes.

Under the U.S. Constitution, states are prohibited from taxing the income of a resident of another state unless the connection with the taxing state reaches a certain level (called “nexus”).  Most states do not tax non-business income of out-of-state corporations. Since the tax must be fairly apportioned, states and localities compute how much income earned by out-of-state corporations (including those in foreign countries) is taxable in the state by applying formulary apportionment to the total business taxable income of the corporation.  Many states use a formula based on ratios of property, payroll, and sales within the state compared to those items outside the state.

History

The first federal income tax was enacted in 1861, and expired in 1872, amid constitutional challenges. A corporate income tax was enacted in 1894, but a key aspect of it was shortly held unconstitutional. In 1909, Congress enacted an excise tax on corporations based on income. After ratification of the Sixteenth amendment to the U.S. Constitution, this became the corporate provisions of the federal income tax.  Amendments to various provisions affecting corporations have been in most or all revenue acts since. Corporate tax provisions are incorporated in Title 26 of the United States Code, known as the Internal Revenue Code.  The present rate of tax on corporate income was adopted in the Tax Reform Act of 1986.

In 2010, corporate tax revenue constituted about 9% of all federal revenues or 1.3% of GDP.
The corporate income tax raised $230.2 billion in fiscal 2019 which accounted for 6.6 percent of total federal revenue and had seen a change from 9 percent in 2017.

Entity classification

Business entities may elect to be treated as corporations taxed at the entity and member levels or as "flow through" entities taxed only at the member level.  However, entities organized as corporations under U.S. state laws and certain foreign entities are treated, per se, as corporations, with no optional election.  The Internal Revenue Service issued the so-called “check-the-box” regulations in 1997 under which entities may make such choice by filing Form 8832.  Absent such election, default classifications for domestic and foreign business entities, combined with voluntary entity elections to opt out of the default classifications (except in the case of “per se corporations” (as defined below)).  If an entity not treated as a corporation has more than one equity owner and at least one equity owner does not have limited liability (e.g., a general partner), it will be classified as a partnership (i.e., a pass-through), and if the entity has a single equity owner and the single owner does not have limited liability protection, it will be treated as a disregarded entity (i.e., a pass-through).

Some entities treated as corporations may make other elections that enable corporate income to be taxed only at the shareholder level, and not at the corporate level.  Such entities are treated similarly to partnerships.  The income of the entity is not taxed at the corporate level, and the members must pay tax on their share of the entity's income.  These include:
 S Corporations, all of whose shareholders must be U.S. citizens or resident individuals; other restrictions apply.  The election requires the consent of all shareholders.  If a corporation is not an S corporation from its formation, special rules apply to the taxation of income earned (or gains accrued) before the election.
 Regulated investment companies (RICs), commonly referred to as mutual funds.
 Real Estate Investment Trusts (REITs).

Taxable income

Determinations of what is taxable and at what rate are made at the federal level based on U.S. tax law. Many but not all states incorporate federal law principles in their tax laws to some extent. Federal taxable income equals gross income (gross receipts and other income less cost of goods sold) less tax deductions. Gross income of a corporation and business deductions are determined in much the same manner as for individuals. All income of a corporation is subject to the same federal tax rate. However, corporations may reduce other federal taxable income by a net capital loss and certain deductions are more limited. Certain deductions are available only to corporations. These include deductions for dividends received and amortization of organization expenses.  Some states tax business income of a corporation differently than nonbusiness income.

Principles for recognizing income and deductions may differ from financial accounting principles. Key areas of difference include differences in the timing of income or deduction, tax exemption for certain income, and disallowance or limitation of certain tax deductions.  IRS rules require that these differences be disclosed in considerable detail for non-small corporations on Schedule M-3 to Form 1120.

Corporate tax rates

Federal tax rates
The top corporate tax rate in the U.S. fell from a high of 53% in 1942 to a maximum of 38% in 1993, which remained in effect until 2018, although corporations in the top bracket were taxed at a rate of 35% between 1993 and 2017.

After the passage of the Tax Cuts and Jobs Act, on December 20, 2017, the corporate tax rate changed to a flat 21%, starting January 1, 2018.

State income tax rates

The adjacent table lists the tax rates on corporate income applied by each state, but not by local governments within states.  Because state and local taxes are deductible expenses for federal income tax purposes, the effective tax rate in each state is not a simple addition of federal and state tax rates.

Although a state may not levy a corporate income tax, they may impose other taxes that are similar. For example, Washington state does not have an income tax but levies a B&O (business and occupation tax) which is arguably a larger burden because the B&O tax is calculated as a percentage of revenue rather than a percentage of net income, like the corporate income tax. This means even loss-making enterprises are required to pay the tax.

Tax credits
Corporations, like other businesses, may be eligible for various tax credits which reduce federal, state or local income tax.  The largest of these by dollar volume is the federal foreign tax credit.  This credit is allowed to all taxpayers for income taxes paid to foreign countries.  The credit is limited to that part of federal income tax before other credits generated by foreign source taxable income.  The credit is intended to mitigate taxation of the same income to the same taxpayer by two or more countries, and has been a feature of the U.S. system since 1918.  Other credits include credits for certain wage payments, credits for investments in certain types of assets including certain motor vehicles, credits for use of alternative fuels and off-highway vehicle use, natural resource related credits, and others. See, e.g., the Research & Experimentation Tax Credit.

Tax deferral

Deferral is one of the main features of the worldwide tax system that allows U.S. multinational companies to delay paying taxes on foreign profits. Under U.S. tax law, companies are not required to pay U.S. tax on their foreign subsidiaries’ profits for many years, even indefinitely until the earnings are returned to U.S. Therefore, it was one of the main reasons that U.S. corporations paid low taxes, even though the corporate tax rate in the U.S. was one of the highest rates (35%) in the world. Although, since January 1, 2018, the corporate tax rate has been changed to a flat 21%.

Deferral is beneficial for U.S. companies to raise the cost of capital relatively to their foreign-based competitors. Their foreign subsidiaries can reinvest their earnings without incurring additional tax that allows them to grow faster. It is also valuable to U.S. corporations with global operations, especially for corporations with income in low-tax countries. Some of the largest and most profitable U.S. corporations pay exceedingly low tax rates through their use of subsidiaries in so-called tax haven countries.  Eighty-three of the United States's 100 biggest public companies have subsidiaries in countries that are listed as tax havens or financial privacy jurisdictions, according to the Government Accountability Office.

However, tax deferral encourages U.S. companies to make job-creating investments offshore even if similar investments in the United States can be more profitable, absent tax considerations. Furthermore, companies try to use accounting techniques to record profits offshore by any way, even if they keep actual investment and jobs in the United States. This explains why U.S. corporations report their largest profits in low-tax countries like the Netherlands, Luxembourg, and Bermuda, though clearly that is not where most real economic activity occurs.

Interest deduction limitations
A tax deduction is allowed at the federal, state and local levels for interest expense incurred by a corporation in carrying out its business activities. Where such interest is paid to related parties, such deduction may be limited.  The classification of instruments as debt on which interest is deductible or as equity with respect to which distributions are not deductible is highly complex and based on court-developed law.  The courts have considered 26 factors in deciding whether an instrument is debt or equity, and no single factor predominates.

Federal tax rules also limit the deduction of interest expense paid by corporations to foreign shareholders based on a complex calculation designed to limit the deduction to 50% of cash flow.  Some states have other limitations on related party payments of interest and royalties.

Corporate tax avoidance and corruption 
Corporate tax avoidance refers to the use of legal means to reduce the income tax payable by a firm. One of the many possible ways to take advantage of this method is by claiming as many credits and deductions as possible.

An empirical study shows that state-level corruption and corporate tax avoidance in the United States are positively related. According to the average effect of an increase in the number of corporate corruption convictions, it is observed that state-level corruption reduces Generally Accepted Accounting Principles (GAAP) tax expense.

The main occurrence of corruption and corporate tax avoidance was in states that had the lowest level of litigation risk despite their ranking in social capital, money laundering and corporate governance. Hence, strengthening law enforcement would definitely control the level of corruption caused by tax avoidance. Corruption is distinct from earnings management predictions, disclosure of accounting restatements as proof of fraudulent accounting and tax accruals quality. Corruption metrics show that firms with their headquarters in a state with a high level of corruption are more likely to participate in tax evasion.

According to research on culture and tax evasion, corruption can be caused by increased organizational, financial and legal complexity and the same factors can influence a firm's chance of engaging in corporate tax avoidance.

Other corporate events
U.S. rules provide that certain corporate events are not taxable to corporations or shareholders.  Significant restrictions and special rules often apply. The rules related to such transactions are quite complex, and exist primarily at the federal level. Many of the states follow federal tax treatment for such events.

Formation
The formation of a corporation by controlling corporate or non-corporate shareholder(s) is generally a nontaxable event.  Generally, in tax free formations the tax attributes of assets and liabilities are transferred to the new corporation along with such assets and liabilities.

Example:  John and Mary are United States residents who operate a business.  They decide to incorporate for business reasons. They transfer assets of the business to Newco, a newly formed Delaware corporation of which they are the sole shareholders, subject to accrued liabilities of the business, solely in exchange for common shares of Newco.  This transfer should not generally cause gain or loss recognition for John, Mary, or Newco.  Newco assumes John and Mary's tax basis in the assets it acquires.  If on the other hand Newco also assumes a bank loan in excess of the basis of the assets transferred less the accrued liabilities, John and Mary will recognize taxable gain for such excess.

Acquisitions
Corporations may merge or acquire other corporations in a manner treated as nontaxable to either of the corporations and/or to their shareholders.  Generally, significant restrictions apply if tax free treatment is to be obtained.  For example, Bigco acquires all of the shares of Smallco from Smallco shareholders in exchange solely for Bigco shares.  This acquisition is not taxable to Smallco or its shareholders under U.S. tax law if certain requirements are met, even if Smallco is then liquidated into or merged with Bigco.

Reorganizations
In addition, corporations may change key aspects of their legal identity, capitalization, or structure in a tax free manner.  Examples of reorganizations that may be tax free include mergers, liquidations of subsidiaries, share for share exchanges, exchanges of shares for assets, changes in form or place of organization, and recapitalizations.

Advance tax planning might mitigate tax risks resulting from a business reorganization or potentially enhance tax savings.

Distribution of earnings

Shareholders of corporations are subject to corporate or individual income tax when corporate earnings are distributed.  Such distribution of earnings is generally referred to as a dividend.

Dividends received by other corporations may be taxed at reduced rates, or exempt from taxation, if the dividends received deduction applies.  Dividends received by individuals (if the dividend is a "qualified dividend") are taxed at reduced rates.  Exceptions to shareholder taxation apply to certain nonroutine distributions, including distributions in liquidation of an 80%  subsidiary or in complete termination of a shareholder's interest.

If a corporation makes a distribution in a non-cash form, it must pay tax on any gain in value of the property distributed.

The United States does not generally require withholding tax on the payment of dividends to shareholders.  However, withholding tax is required if the shareholder is not a U.S. citizen or resident or U.S. corporation, or in some other circumstances (see Tax withholding in the United States).

Earnings and profits
U.S. corporations are permitted to distribute amounts in excess of earnings under the laws of most states under which they may be organized.  A distribution by a corporation to shareholders is treated as a dividend to the extent of earnings and profits (E&P), a tax concept similar to retained earnings.   E&P is current taxable income, with significant adjustments, plus prior E&P reduced by distributions of E&P.  Adjustments include depreciation differences under MACRS, add-back of most tax exempt income, and deduction of many non-deductible expenses (e.g., 50% of meals and entertainment).  Corporate distributions in excess of E&P are generally treated as a return of capital to the shareholders.

Liquidation
The liquidation of a corporation is generally treated as an exchange of a capital asset under the Internal Revenue Code.  If a shareholder bought stock for $300 and receives $500 worth of property from a corporation in a liquidation, that shareholder would recognize a capital gain of $200.  An exception is when a parent corporation liquidates a subsidiary, which is tax-free so long as the parent owns more than 80% of the subsidiary.  There are certain anti-abuse rules to avoid the engineering of losses in corporate liquidations.

Foreign corporation branches
The United States taxes foreign (i.e., non-U.S.) corporations differently than domestic corporations.  Foreign corporations generally are taxed only on business income when the income is effectively connected with the conduct of a U.S. trade or business (i.e., in a branch).  This tax is imposed at the same rate as the tax on business income of a resident corporation.

The U.S. also imposes a branch profits tax on foreign corporations with a U.S. branch, to mimic the dividend withholding tax which would be payable if the business was conducted in a U.S. subsidiary corporation and profits were remitted to the foreign parent as dividends.  The branch profits tax is imposed at the time profits are remitted or deemed remitted outside the U.S.

In addition, foreign corporations are subject to withholding tax at 30% on dividends, interest, royalties, and certain other income.  Tax treaties may reduce or eliminate this tax. This tax applies to a "dividend equivalent amount," which is the corporation's effectively connected earnings and profits for the year, less investments the corporation makes in its U.S. assets (money and adjusted bases of property connected with the conduct of a U.S. trade or business). The tax is imposed even if there is no distribution.

Consolidated returns

Corporations 80% or more owned by a common parent corporation may file a consolidated return for federal and some state income taxes.  These returns include all income, deductions, and credits of all members of the controlled group, generally expressed without intercompany eliminations.   Some states allow or require a combined or consolidated return for U.S. members of a "unitary" group under common control and in related businesses.  Certain transactions between group members may not be recognized until the occurrence of events for other members.  For example, if Company A sells goods to sister Company B, the profit on the sale is deferred until Company B uses or sells the goods. All members of a consolidated group must use the same tax year.

Transfer pricing

The principles and procedures of pricing transactions within and between firms under shared ownership or control is referred to as transfer pricing. Transactions between a corporation and related parties are subject to potential adjustment by tax authorities.  These adjustments may be applied to both U.S. and foreign related parties, and to individuals, corporations, partnerships, estates, and trusts.

The U.S. has a set of rules and regulations in place to protect the tax base by preventing income from being moved among related parties due to improper pricing of party transactions. It also aims to ensure that goods and services provided by connected firms are transferred at arm's length and priced according to market circumstances, allowing earning to be reflected in the appropriate tax jurisdiction.

Transfer pricing in the U.S. is governed by section 482 of the Internal Revenue Code (IRC) and applies when two or more organizations are owned or managed by the same interests. Section 482 applies to all transactions between related parties and commonly controlled parties, regardless of taxpayer intent, according to regulatory guidance. To avoid tax evasion or to clearly reflect their income, the IRS may change the income, deductions, credits, or allowances of frequently managed taxpayers under Section 482 of the Code.

Alternative taxes

The United States federal Alternative Minimum Tax was eliminated in 2018.

Corporations may also be subject to additional taxes in certain circumstances.  These include taxes on excess accumulated undistributed earnings and personal holding companies and restrictions on graduated rates for personal service corporations.

Some states, such as New Jersey, impose alternative taxes based on measures other than taxable income.  Among such measures are gross income, pipeline revenues, gross receipts, and various asset or capital measures.  In addition, some states impose a tax on capital of corporations or on shares issued and outstanding.  The U. S. state of Michigan previously taxed businesses on an alternative base that did not allow compensation of employees as a tax deduction and allowed full deduction of the cost of production assets upon acquisition.

Tax returns

Corporations subject to U.S. tax must file federal and state income tax returns.  Different tax returns are required at the federal and some state levels for different types of corporations or corporations engaged in specialized businesses. The United States has 13 variations on the basic Form 1120 for S corporations, insurance companies, Domestic International Sales Corporations, foreign corporations, and other entities.  The structure of the forms and the imbedded schedules vary by type of form.

United States federal corporate tax returns require both computation of taxable income from components thereof and reconciliation of taxable income to financial statement income.  Corporations with assets exceeding $10 million must complete a detailed 3 page reconciliation on Schedule M-3 indicating which differences are permanent (i.e., do not reverse, such as disallowed expenses or tax exempt interest) and which are temporary (e.g., differences in when income or expense is recognized for book and tax purposes).

Some state corporate tax returns have significant imbedded or attached schedules related to features of the state's tax system that differ from the federal system.

Preparation of non-simple corporate tax returns can be time-consuming.  For example, the U.S. Internal Revenue Service states that the average time needed to complete Form 1120-S, for privately held companies electing flow through status, is over 56 hours, not including recordkeeping time.

Federal corporate tax returns for most types of corporations are due by the 15th day of the third month following the tax year (March 15 for calendar year).  State corporate tax return due dates vary, but most are due either on the same date or one month after the federal due date. Extensions of time to file are routinely granted.

Penalties may be imposed at the federal and state levels for late filing or non-filing of corporate income tax returns.  In addition, other substantial penalties may apply with respect to failures related to returns and tax return computations.  Intentional failure to file or intentional filing of incorrect returns may result in criminal penalties to those involved.

See also
 Qualified Production Activities Income

References

Further reading
 Watson, Garrett and William McBride, "Evaluating Proposals to Increase the Corporate Tax Rate and Levy a Minimum Tax on Corporate Book Income,"  FISCAL FACT (Tax Foundation, No. 751 Feb. 2021) 

Standard tax texts
 IRS Publication 542, online for corporations.
 Willis, Eugene; Hoffman, William H. Jr., et al: South-Western Federal Taxation, published annually.  2013 edition (cited above as Willis|Hoffman) .
 Pratt, James W.; Kulsrud, William N., et al: Federal Taxation, updated periodically.  2013 edition  (cited above as Pratt & Kulsrud).
 Fox, Stephen C., Income Tax in the USA, published annually. 2013 edition 
Treatises
 Bittker, Boris I. and Eustice, James S.: Federal Income Taxation of Corporations and Shareholders:  abridged paperback  or as a subscription service.  Cited above as Bittker & Eustice.
 Crestol, Jack; Hennessey, Kevin M.; and Yates, Richard F.:  "Consolidated Tax Return : Principles, Practice, Planning, 1998 
 Kahn & Lehman. Corporate Income Taxation
 Healy, John C. and Schadewald, Michael S.: Multistate Corporate Tax Course 2010, CCH,  (also available as a multi-volume guide)
 Hoffman, et al.: Corporations, Partnerships, Estates and Trusts, 
 Momburn, et al.:  Mastering Corporate Tax'', Carolina Academic Press, 
 Keightley, Mark P. and Molly F. Sherlock: The Corporate Income Tax System: Overview and Options for Reform, Congressional Research Service, 2014.